The 2011 Copeland Borough Council election took place on 5 May 2011 to elect members of Copeland Borough Council in Cumbria, England. The whole council was up for election and the Labour Party stayed in overall control of the council.

Background
At the last election in 2007 Labour won 31 seats, compared to 19 Conservatives and 1 independent. However between 2007 and 2011 Labour councillors Brian Dixon and Sam Meteer quit the party to sit as independents.

A total of 95 candidates stood in the election for the 51 seats being contested. These were 45 Labour, 37 Conservative, 4 independent, 4 British National Party, 3 Green Party and 2 Liberal Democrats. Meanwhile, 12 sitting councillors stood down at the election.

Election result
The results saw Labour hold control of the council after winning 34 of the 51 seats, up 5 on the situation before the election and 3 more than at the 2007 election. The Conservatives dropped 4 seats to have 15 councillors, while 2 independents were elected in Arlecdon and Distington. Overall turnout at the election was 40.98%.

Labour's biggest gains came in Bransty ward in Whitehaven, where they gained all 3 seats from the Conservatives. This included defeating the Conservative parliamentary candidate for Copeland at the 2010 general election, Chris Whiteside. Labour also picked up one seat in Newtown from the Conservatives and defeated the independent, former Labour, councillor Sam Meteer in Egremont North.

Ward results

References

2011 English local elections
2011
2010s in Cumbria